The Northeastern Highlands ecoregion is a Level III ecoregion designated by the United States Environmental Protection Agency (EPA) in the U.S. states of Vermont, New Hampshire, Massachusetts, Maine, Connecticut, New York, New Jersey, and Pennsylvania. The ecoregion extends from the northern tip of Maine and runs south along the Appalachian Mountain Range into eastern Pennsylvania.  Discontiguous sections are located among New York's Adirondack Mountains and the Catskill Range. The largest portion of the Northeastern Highlands ecoregion encompasses several sub mountain ranges including the Berkshires, Green Mountains, Taconic, and White Mountains. 

The mountainous region is underlain by metamorphic rock and glacial till. The ecoregion is flanked by several others including the: Acadian Plains and Hills, Eastern Great Lakes Lowlands, Northeastern Coastal Zone, Northern Allegheny Plateau, Ridge and Valley, and Northern Piedmont ecoregions. The region is characterized by hot humid summers and cold snowy winters. The nutrient-poor spodosols and other cryic soil types of the region support boreal (north) and broadleaf (south) forests that cover the majority of the region. Ecotourism, forestry, and agriculture are the predominant land uses of the sparsely populated region. Though much of the region was once cleared to make farmland, much of it has reverted into natural forested areas; to a lesser extent, dairy and crops are still grown in lowland valleys and beef cattle on upland pastures. The ecoregion has been subdivided into thirty-three Level IV ecoregions.

Native wild animals of the area include American black bear, white-tailed deer, moose, bobcat, coyote, skunk, raccoon, chipmunk, squirrel, opossum, porcupine, fisher, eastern turkey, northern bobwhite, great blue heron, ducks, and a host of other bird, reptile, amphibian, and fish species. The Northeastern Highlands ecoregion was within the range of other large mammals at the onset of European settlement; these included boreal woodland caribou, which inhabited northern Vermont, New Hampshire, and Maine, as well as American bison, which judicious estimates have placed in western portions of the Catskills and Adirondacks. Puma and eastern elk, too, once inhabited a majority of the region.

Level IV ecoregions

58a. Taconic Mountains

58aa. Acid Sensitive Adirondacks 

The Acid Sensitive Adirondacks derive their name from the underlying bedrock which has a low acid-neutralizing capacity and is one of the regions of the Northeastern Highlands that has been most affected by acid rain. The Acid Sensitive Adirondacks constitutes the largest level IV region of the Adirondack Mountain range. Acid rain has acidified the region's lakes to the point where they are uninhabitable for fish; terrestrial effects of acid rain have resulted in leaching of calcium and release of aluminum, which has resulted in tree mortality. Tree cover in the region is dominated by conifers including red, white, and black spruce, as well as balsam fir, red maple, yellow birch, and black cherry.

58ab. Northern and Western Adirondack Foothills

58ac. Eastern Adirondack Foothills

58ad. Central Adirondacks

58ae. Tug Hill Plateau

58af. Tug Hill Transition

58ag. Rensselaer Plateau

58b. Western New England Marble Valleys

58c. Green Mountains/Berkshire Highlands 
The Green Mountains (Vermont)/Berkshire Highlands (Massachusetts) are part of the same level IV ecoregion, but are defined by different names per their political state boundaries. Like most of the Northeastern Highlands ecoregion, the bedrock consists of metamorphic and glacial till and the soils are acidic, coarse, and low in nutrients. The area is primarily second growth forest, which has returned as a mixed conifer and hardwood stand. Common tree species include red oak, sugar maple, American beech, yellow birch, eastern hemlock, white pine, white ash, basswood, tamarack, black spruce, balsam fir, and white birch.

This region includes the towns of Killington, Waterbury, and Stowe, Vermont, and Charlemont, Massachusetts. The primary land use includes active tourism, such as skiing, hiking, biking, and snowmobiling, as well as forestry, maple syrup production, cattle, and hay production. This region is also home to several state parks and national woodlands including the Green Mountain National Forest, Calvin Coolidge, Camels Hump, Mount Mansfield, and Okemo State Forests, and Woodford, Molly Stark, Lake Shaftsbury, Fort Dummer, Emerald Lake, Lowell Lake, Lake St. Catherine, Camp Plymouth, Mount Ascutney, Wilgus, and Hazen's Notch state parks.

58d. Lower Berkshire Hills

58e. Berkshire Transition

58f. Vermont Piedmont

58g. Worcester/Monadnock Plateau

58h. Reading Prong

58i. Glaciated Reading Prong/Hudson Highlands

58j. Upper Montane/Alpine Zone 
The Northeastern Upper Montane/Alpine Zone is largely discontiguous, as it appears only at the highest peaks in the region. The ecozone is characterized by shallow acidic soils and nadir soils and by a short (40-80 day) frost-free season. The region is typically the coldest of the Northeastern Highlands. Precipitation is high in all seasons.

The Upper Montane Zone generally occurs above  where mountain birch, balsam fir and black spruce are dominant. These peaks, island refuges, are relics of a larger ecosystem that covered New England when the last glaciers melted in the region ~12,000 years ago. These unique ecosystems are home to several insect species, like the endangered White Mountain fritillary butterfly. The American pipit is a unique bird species and the only obligate alpine nesting bird in New England.

58k. Green Mountain Foothills 
The Green Mountain Foothills (aka Champlain hills) form a transitional ecoregion between the northern Green Mountains on the east to the Champlain Lowlands on the west. The area is composed mostly of frigid spodosols; sandy, coarse-loamy, and fine-loamy soils and a dense mixed forest. The region, although reforested, it still mosaiced by dairy, hay, and pasture crops.

58l. Northern Piedmont 
The Northern Piedmont ecoregion in Vermont is distinguished from the Vermont Piedmont by it northern location and associated colder climate. It is sometimes referred to as the Northern Vermont Piedmont and is distinct from the Northern piedmont ecoregion extending from New York to Virginia. Bedrock in this Vermont region is mostly limestone, phyllite, mica, schist, quartzite, and slate, with lesser areas composed of granite gneiss; hence it is different from surrounding granite mountain ranges. The Northern Piedmont is mountainous with large open valleys, making it better suited to farming than the hillier terrain of the neighboring Green Mountains, though the colder climate means that cropping or grazing seasons are short (100-140 growing days). The climate is more seasonal than in the southerly humid continental range, with a seasonal summer monsoon which is twice that of winter snowfall. Trees in the region are similar to those in the Green Mountains, wherein northern hardwoods dominate on lower elevation terrain and mixed hardwood and hemlock or spruce–fir forests are supported on upland terrain.

Agriculture abounds in the Northeast Kingdom and commonly includes production of hay, cattle corn, oats, vegetables, and grazing land. The area is sparsely populated, but includes Vermont's capitol, Montpelier (the least populated state capital in the US) and the city of Barre. Brighton State Park is located in the Northern Piedmont. This area and the Quebec/New England Boundary Mountains support the most moose in Vermont and New Hampshire.

58m. Quebec/New England Boundary Mountains 
The Boundary Mountains extend between Quebec and New England from northeast Vermont into Central Maine. The Longfellow Mountains (named for Henry Wadsworth Longfellow) are within this region, as is Maine's Baxter State Park. The area is dominated by low, open mountains, interspersed with deep ponds. Likewise, Lake Willoughby, a National Natural Landmark in Vermont, is a good example of a fjord-like deep lake surrounded by tall mountains. Like the other Northeast Highland ecoregions, the Quebec/New England Boundary Mountains are cold, yet humid continental with an average of 85-125 frost-free days. The region is mostly forested and dominated by conifers, with some mixed and deciduous forests. High elevation regions are mostly spruce-fir, red spruce, balsam fir, and mountain, paper, and yellow birch. The area is sparsely populated and there is little farming; the region is mostly used for hunting, recreation, and maple syrup production.

58n. White Mountain Foothills

58o. Northern Connecticut Valley

58p. White Mountains/Blue Mountains

58q. Sunapee Uplands

58r. Sebago-Ossipee Hills and Plains

58s. Western Maine Foothills

58t. Upper St. John Wet Flats

58u. Moosehead-Churchill Lakes

58v. St. John Uplands

58w. International Boundary Plateau

58x. Taconic Foothills

58y. Catskill High Peaks

58z. Adirondack Peaks

See also 
New England Uplands

References

Ecoregions of the United States